The 1924 Akron Pros season was their fifth in the league. The team improved on their previous output of 1–6, winning two games. They tied for thirteenth place in the league.

Schedule

Standings

References

Akron Pros seasons
Akron Pros
Akron Pros